Queenswater was a train station along the Long Beach Branch of the Long Island Rail Road. It was located along Reynolds Channel and was used between 1898 and 1936 to serve numerous fishing clubs and hotels.

History
Queenswater station was originally built by the New York and Long Beach Railroad as a signal stop in April 1898 and was named "Inner Beach." It consisted entirely of a single low cinder wooden platform, and had no depot building. It served several fishing shacks and eventually the Molitor's Hotel on Long Beach Island. Thirteen months after the station was established, the name of the station was changed to "Queenswater."

Repeated storm damage to the original Long Beach station, as well as the rails and equipment leading to it forced community members to demand that the terminus be relocated from the Atlantic Ocean to Reynolds Channel. The city got its wish, and the new terminal was built in 1909, which forced the closure of Club House station. The LIRR tried unsuccessfully to seek permission from the New York Public Service Commission to close the station 1910, and again in 1915 by removing fishing shanties. The nearby Wreck Lead station closed on December 31, 1927, but Queenswater station remained in operation until it was finally closed in June 1936.

See also
Long Beach Branch

References

Former Long Island Rail Road stations in Nassau County, New York
Long Beach, New York
Railway stations in the United States opened in 1898
Railway stations closed in 1936